Bollate Nord railway station is a railway station in Italy. It is part of the Milan–Saronno railway and is located in Via Vittorio Veneto, serving the northern part of the town of Bollate.

Services 
The station is served by the lines S1 and S3 of the Milan suburban railway service, operated by the Lombard railway company Trenord.

See also 
 Milan suburban railway service

References

External links 
 Ferrovienord official site - Bollate Nord railway station 

Railway stations in Lombardy
Ferrovienord stations
Milan S Lines stations
Railway stations opened in 1991
1991 establishments in Italy
Bollate
Railway stations in Italy opened in the 20th century